Janine Marciano is a Filipino volleyball player. She was a member of San Beda Red Lions women's University team in the NCAA.

Volleyball career 
In 2016, she transferred from BaliPure Purest Water Defenders to Cignal HD Spikers.

In 2022, she was signed again by the BaliPure Purest Water Defenders. 

In August 2022, Marciano was signed by the new team Akari Chargers.

Clubs 
 PNP Lady Patrollers - (2013)
 Cagayan Valley Lady Rising Suns - (2014)
 PLDT Home Ultera Ultra Fast Hitters - (2015)
 BaliPure Purest Water Defenders - (2016, 2022)
 Cignal HD Spikers - (2017 - 2022)
 Akari Chargers - (2022 - present)

Awards

Individual

Clubs

References

Living people
1992 births
Filipino women's volleyball players
Sportspeople from Quezon City
San Beda University alumni
Wing spikers
Volleyball players from Metro Manila
National Collegiate Athletic Association (Philippines) players
Outside hitters